Cecina is a comune (municipality) of  28,322 inhabitants in the Province of Livorno in the Italian region Tuscany, located about  southwest of Florence and about  southeast of Livorno.

The territory of Cecina borders the following municipalities: Bibbona, Casale Marittimo, Castellina Marittima, Guardistallo, Montescudaio, Riparbella, Rosignano Marittimo.

An archaeological park close to the town houses the remains of a Roman villa from the 1st century BC.

History

A settlement was founded here by the Roman consul Albinus Caecina, who was a descendant of an ancient Etruscan family. After the fall of the Western Roman Empire, the territory suffered a long period of decline, which only came to an end when the Grand Duke Leopold II of Tuscany began to develop local agriculture.

The modern town was founded in 1852, but a part of the city was destroyed during World War II. From the 1960s onwards, it has developed into a popular tourist resort.

Twin towns
 Gilching, Germany, since 1989 
 Sagunto, Spain
 Sin-le-Noble, France

References

External links

 Official website